Leopold I (F930) is a  of the Marine Component of the Belgian Armed Forces. Prior to 29 March 2007, the ship was known as HNLMS Karel Doorman (F827). It is one of the two frigates of this class purchased from the Royal Netherlands Navy on 22 December 2005.

HNLMS Karel Doorman

She was the third ship in the Royal Netherlands Navy to be named after Admiral Karel Doorman, who was  killed during the Battle of the Java Sea. The ship was laid down on 26 February 1985, launched on 20 April 1988 and commissioned on 31 May 1991.

She took part in anti-drug operations in the Caribbean together with the US Navy, was part of the UN operations in the Adriatic Sea during the conflicts in the former republics of Yugoslavia, as well as various NATO exercises.

Leopold I
On 22 December 2005, Karel Doorman and Willem van der Zaan were sold to Belgium.

Karel Doorman was taken out of service in 2006 and turned over to the Belgian Marine Component on 29 March 2007 where the ship was christened Leopold I, in honour of the first King of the Belgians, by Queen Fabiola of Belgium at Zeebrugge Marine Base. The patronage of Leopold I was accepted by the city of Nivelles.

East African deployment
Leopold I embarked upon her first official mission for the Naval Component on 5 September 2007. She was deployed to East Africa as part of the international mission against Somali pirates. The operation was given the codename East African Venture. On 30 November 2007 she arrived back at her home port of Zeebrugge, marking the end of the deployment.

Fight against ISIL 

In November 2015, a French Navy press release stated that Leopold I would be part of the  task force launching strikes against the Islamic State of Iraq and the Levant. Her deployment took place from 18 November 2015 to 4 January 2016.

Coronavirus pandemic 
Belgian Defense announced on 25 March 2020 that a crew member had tested positive for SARS-CoV-2.  The sailor had been evacuated via air to Den Helder on 20 March 2020 after he began showing symptoms, and was quarantined at home when the test returned positive on 24 March. As a precaution, the ship broke off from its operation with the French carrier battle group led by Charles de Gaulle and returned to Zeebrugge on 27 March 2020, about a month earlier than planned.

References

External links

 Section of the website of the Belgian Ministry of Defence about the F930 Leopold I 
 Homepage of Hr. Ms. Karel Doorman (in Dutch)
 some pictures of F930 on Kiel Canal

 

1988 ships
Ships built in Vlissingen
Karel Doorman-class frigates
Karel Doorman-class frigates of the Belgian Navy
Naval ships of Belgium
Naval ships involved in the COVID-19 pandemic